The 1953 NAIA basketball tournament was held in March at Municipal Auditorium in Kansas City, Missouri. The 16th annual NAIA basketball tournament featured 32 teams playing in a single-elimination format.

The championship game would feature Southwest Missouri State, now Missouri State University, and Hamline (10th appearance in tournament). The Bears were coached by Bob Vanatta. The championship game was the first time that these two teams had ever met in the tournament. The Bears would defeat the Pipers to win another national championship, 79–71.

It was the first time since 1937 and 1938, the first two years of the tournament, that the same team would win the national championship title. (The first two tournaments were also won by a Missouri university, Central Missouri State.)

Playing for third place were Indiana State and East Texas State, now Texas A&M University–Commerce. It was the first time that these two teams had played each other. The Sycamores defeated the Lions by a score of 74 to 71. 

The 1953 tournament would be Hamline's first, and only, second place title as well as Indiana State's first, and only, third place title, making them the first two schools to win, outright, first, second, third, and fourth places in the NAIA tournament (Georgetown (KY) the only other school to have that honor).

It is the last year without the Coach of the Year Award. 1953 is the first tournament to feature a Nazarene University (Pasadena, now Point Loma Nazarene). Perennial staples to the tournament, only a handful of years have been absence of a Nazarene University playing. There were two games in which all-time top performances would be recorded.

Awards and honors
Many of the records set by the 1953 tournament have been broken, and many of the awards were established much later:
Leading Scorer Award est. 1963
Leading Rebounder Award est. 1963
Charles Stevenson Hustle Award est. 1958
Coach of the Year est. 1954
Player of the Year est. 1994
Top single-game performances: 3rd Harold Wolfe of Findlay (Ohio) playing against Pasadena (Calif.) scored 25 field goals and  4 free throws totaling 54 points for one game. Findlay won the game.
Top single-game performances: 22nd Pete Kinkead of Geneva (Pa.) playing against Tennessee State, scored 14 field goals and 15 free throws totaling 43 points for one game. Geneva did not win the game.
All-time scoring leader; first appearance: James Miller, 18th, East Texas State (1953,54,55), 13 games, 103 field goals, 40 free throws, totaling 246 points, 18.9 average per game.
All-time scoring leader; second appearance: E.C. O’Neal, 9th, Arkansas Tech (1952,53,54,55), 13 games, 122 field goals, 43 free throws, totaling 287 points, 22.1 average per game.
All-time scoring leaders; final appearance: Lloyd Thorgaard, 10th, Hamline (Minn.) (1950,51,52,53), 15 games, 111 field goals,  61 free throws,  283 total points, 18.9 average per game; James Fritsche, 14th, Hamline (Minn.) (1950,51,52,53), 15 games, 113 field goals, 46 free throws,  272 total points, 18.1 average per game.

Bracket

See also
 1953 NCAA basketball tournament
 1953 National Invitation Tournament

References

NAIA Men's Basketball Championship
Tournament
NAIA men's basketball tournament
NAIA men's basketball tournament